Crato is a municipality in Portalegre District in Portugal. The population in 2011 was 3,708, in an area of 398.07 km2.

The present Mayor is José Correia Luz, elected by the Socialist Party. The municipal holiday is Easter Monday.

Parishes
Administratively, the municipality is divided into 5 civil parishes (freguesias):
 Aldeia da Mata
 Crato e Mártires, Flor da Rosa e Vale do Peso
 Gáfete
 Monte da Pedra

History 

Crato has been the headquarters of the Knights Hospitaller in Portugal since 1340. The head of the order was known as the Prior of Crato.

References

External links
Town Hall official website
Photos from Crato

Populated places in Portalegre District
Municipalities of Portalegre District